Hans Mikael Martinsson (born 25 November 1968) is a Swedish former ski jumper.

World Cup

Standings

Wins

External links

1968 births
Living people
Ski jumpers at the 1992 Winter Olympics
Ski jumpers at the 1994 Winter Olympics
Swedish male ski jumpers
Olympic ski jumpers of Sweden
People from Gällivare Municipality
Sportspeople from Norrbotten County